Third Voice is a software programme.

(The) Third Voice or (The) 3rd Voice may also refer to:

The 3rd Voice (also known as The Third Voice), 1960 American thriller crime drama film directed and written by Hubert Cornfield
"The Third Voice", 2016 episode of Murder (UK TV series)
3rd Voice is a fantasy webcomic serial written by Evan Dahm starting in 2022.